Matthew "Matt" Ladley (born May 17, 1991) is an American snowboarder who won the gold medal in the superpipe at Winter X Games XX.
Ladley competed in the 29th season of The Amazing Race with his partner Redmond Ramos where they finished in fourth place.

References

External links
 
 

1991 births
American male snowboarders
Living people
X Games athletes
The Amazing Race (American TV series) contestants
21st-century American people